The Zimbabwe national cricket team toured Pakistan from November to December 1993 and played in three cricket tests in Karachi, Rawalpindi and Lahore and three One Day Internationals (ODI) at the same venues. The Zimbabwe team across the tour was captained by Andy Flower while for Pakistan it was Waqar Younis.

Before the tour, Zimbabwe played in a tour match against the Bank of Khyber eleven which ended in a draw. In the test series, Pakistan would win the first two tests by 131 and 52 runs respectively to win the series 2–0 with the third test being a draw. Zimbabwean batsman Alistair Campbell being the leading run scorer of the series with 205 runs while Waqar Younis from Pakistan was the leading wicket taker of the series with 27 wickets for the series.

After the test series, the team played in three ODI's all at the same venues as the test series with Pakistan winning the respective matches by 7 wickets, 6 wickets and 75 runs respectively.

Test series summary

1st Test

2nd Test

3rd Test

One Day Internationals (ODIs)

1st ODI

2nd ODI

3rd ODI

References

External links

1993 in Pakistani cricket
1993 in Zimbabwean cricket
International cricket competitions from 1991–92 to 1994
Pakistani cricket seasons from 1970–71 to 1999–2000
1993